WYYD (107.9 MHz "New Country 107-9 YYD") is a commercial FM radio station licensed to Amherst, Virginia, and serving the Roanoke-Lynchburg media market. WYYD airs a country music radio format and is owned and operated by iHeartMedia.  Monday through Saturday mornings, the station carries The Bobby Bones Show, based in Nashville and syndicated by Premiere Networks, an iHeart subsidiary.  Overnight, it carries After Midnite with Granger Smith.

The studios and offices are on Old Forest Road in Lynchburg.  The transmitter is near Sweet Hollow Road (County Route 615) in Big Island, Virginia. A 2,500 watt booster station, WYYD-1, is heard in Roanoke, also on 107.9 MHz.

History

Always a Country station, the station's first call sign was WCNV, which was assigned on January 16, 1981 and officially launched on January 27 with the branding "FM 108 WCNV."  The station was co-owned with AM 1420 WAMV  WCNV was powered at only 4,100 watts, so it primarily served its own community and wasn't aimed at the larger Roanoke-Lynchburg market.  It was owned by Central Virginia Media, Inc. which sold both stations to Winfas, Inc. in 1983.

WCNV switched its call sign to WYYD at midnight on November 18, 1985 and changed its branding to "108 WYYD; Today's Best Country and Your All-Time Favorites." The power had been increased to 20,500 watts on a 1,767 foot tower, making it a regional country station for the larger Roanoke-Lynchburg market.  In 1994, the station was sold to Benchmark Communications for $9 million and the studios were moved to Lynchburg.

In 1999, the station changed hands again, this time to Capstar Broadcasting, which later became AMFM Broadcasting, a forerunner to current owner, iHeartMedia.  Just after 2000, the slogan was changed to "Virginia's Best Country."

On September 3, 2010, WYYD changed its branding to "Country 107-9 WYYD; The Widest Variety of Country Music."  It played a mix of mainstream and classic country.  On the morning on September 16, 2013, WYYD changed its branding again to "New Country 107-9 YYD."

References

External links
 New Country 107-9 YYD Online
 

YYD
Country radio stations in the United States
Radio stations established in 1981
IHeartMedia radio stations